Arip Kurniawan (born March 5, 1987) is an Indonesian footballer who currently plays for PSAP Sigli in the Indonesia Super League.

Club statistics

References

External links

1987 births
Association football forwards
Living people
Indonesian footballers
Liga 1 (Indonesia) players
PSAP Sigli players
Indonesian Premier Division players
Persibo Bojonegoro players
Persipasi Bekasi players
Perserang Serang players
People from Serang
Sportspeople from Banten